Tenaris S.A.  is a global manufacturer and supplier of steel pipes and related services, primarily for the energy industry with nearly 23,000 employees around the world.  It is a majority-owned  subsidiary company of the Techint Group, which has interests in steel, energy, engineering and construction and industrial equipment.

It is headquartered in Luxembourg and is also a supplier of welded steel pipes for gas pipelines in South America.  It has manufacturing facilities in Argentina, Brazil, Canada, China, Colombia, Italy, Japan, Mexico, Romania, and the US, and customer service centers in over 30 countries. Tenaris has an annual production capacity of 3.3 million tons of seamless and 2.8 million tons of welded pipes, and annual consolidated net sales in excess of US$12.1 billion (2008). In 2007 Tenaris bought Hydril and later split the premium connections from pressure control side of the business. The pressure control business was sold to GE Oil and Gas in April 2008.

The company's CEO is Paolo Rocca;

In March 2019, Tenaris announced a $1.2 billion deal to acquire IPSCO Tubulars from Russian steelmaker OAO TMK.

FCPA fine
On 17 May 2011, Tenaris agreed to pay the US Department of Justice US$8.9 million in the first ever deferred prosecution agreement with the Securities and Exchange Commission.

A settlement was reached after Tenaris voluntarily disclosed details of illicit payments made to officials of an Uzbek state-controlled oil firm which were not properly recorded in the company's financial statements.

According to the Department of Justice, Tenaris paid bribes through local agents to obtain competitor’s bid information, which it used to submit revised bids in order to secure tenders.

An official at the Department of Justice said: "The company's immediate self-reporting, thorough internal investigation, full cooperation with SEC staff, enhanced anti-corruption procedures and enhanced training made it an appropriate candidate for the Enforcement Division's first Deferred Prosecution Agreement."

Violence in Mexico
On 24 December 2013, over 100 disgruntled ex-employees of Tenaris Tamsa in Veracruz stormed the facilities and were attacked with sticks, pipes and stones by supporters of the worker's union, "Sindicato Union y Progreso", or SNUP.  These workers had been dismissed by the company in 2012 for their violence after attempting to elect a new union leader, Jose Carlos Guevara Moreno, "El Profe." Pascual Lagunes Ochoa, a convicted fellon who as of April 2016 remains as the union leader of SNUP, and often attends and speaks at public events. The ex-employees are currently in a legal battle against the company, having been denied their severance.  They have also requested that it be audited by Hacienda, the tax collection branch of the government.

See also

Ternium

References

External links

Companies listed on the Mexican Stock Exchange
Companies listed on the New York Stock Exchange
Multinational companies
Manufacturing companies of Luxembourg
Companies established in 2001
Techint
Companies based in Luxembourg City